Dieudonné Cédor (1925 – September 27, 2010) was a Haitian painter. Born in Anse-à-Veau, Cédor had his work displayed around the world, with exhibits in Guatemala (1951), Mexico (1952), Germany, Belgium, the Netherlands (1968), Miami (1969), Venezuela, Colombia, and Panama. In 1967, he painted a mural for the Port-au-Prince International Airport. In 1953, he was awarded  Haiti's Labor Department exhibition prize and, in 1957, the Grand Work Prize of the Haitian Office of Tourism.

References
 
 Haïti-Culture : L’artiste peintre Dieudonné Cédor est mort

External links

1925 births
2010 deaths
Haitian artists
Haitian painters
Haitian male painters